Mexcala formosa is a jumping spider species in the genus Mexcala that lives in Ethiopia. The male was first described in 2008.

References

Endemic fauna of Ethiopia
Spiders described in 2008
Spiders of Africa
Fauna of Ethiopia
Salticidae
Taxa named by Wanda Wesołowska